Adelina Amélia Lopes Vieira (1850 - 1922 or 1933) was a Brazilian poet, playwright and children's writer.

Life
Born in Lisbon, she came to Brazil as a young child, and graduated as a teacher around 1870. Contos Infantis (1886) was written with her sister Julia Lopes de Almeida. In 1899 she contributed to A Mensageira, a literary magazine edited by Presciliana Duarte de Almeida which was aimed at Brazilian women. At the start of the twentieth century she wrote and translated several plays.

Works
 Saudade de palmeiras e No echo das damas, 1879
 Margaritas, 1879
 (with Julia Lopes de Almeida) Contos Infantis [Children's Tales], 1886.
 Destinos, 1890
 A viagem de Murilo
 As duas doses
 Expiação
 (trans.) A terrina by Ernest d’Hervilly, 1907

References

1850 births
1923 deaths
Year of death uncertain
19th-century Brazilian poets
19th-century Brazilian women writers
Brazilian women poets
Brazilian children's writers
Brazilian women children's writers
20th-century Brazilian dramatists and playwrights
Portuguese emigrants to Brazil